Tariq Haroon (born 3 February 1977) is a Pakistani cricketer. He has played in 77 first-class and 56 List A cricket matches since 2000.

References

External links
 

1977 births
Living people
Pakistani cricketers
Karachi cricketers
Karachi Blues cricketers
Karachi Dolphins cricketers
Pakistan Customs cricketers
Cricketers from Karachi